Enyalioides azulae is a species of lizards in the family Hoplocercidae. It is known from only its type locality in the Cordillera Azul National Park in Peru.

The specific name "azulae" is derived from the Spanish word azul, "blue". It refers to the type locality, making the species the "Enyalioides of the [Cordillera] Azul".

References

External links

Enyalioides
Lizards of South America
Reptiles of Peru
Endemic fauna of Peru
Reptiles described in 2013
Taxa named by Pablo J. Venegas
Taxa named by Omar Torres-Carvajal
Taxa named by Vilma Duran
Taxa named by Kevin de Queiroz